Sir George Blundell, 2nd Baronet (died 1675) was an Anglo-Irish politician. 

Blundell was the son of Sir Francis Blundell, 1st Baronet and Joyce Serjeant, and on 26 April 1625 he succeeded to his father's baronetcy. Blundell was the Member of Parliament for Dingle in the Irish House of Commons from 1639 to 1649. He held the office of High Sheriff of King's County in 1657. Between 1661 and 1666 he represented Philipstown in the Irish Commons. Blundell was identified to be one of the Knights of the Royal Oak, however, the order was never established.

He married Sarah Colley, daughter of Sir William Colley and Elizabeth Giffard, and was succeeded in his title by his son, Francis Blundell.

References

Year of birth unknown
1675 deaths
17th-century Anglo-Irish people
Baronets in the Baronetage of Ireland
High Sheriffs of King's County
Irish MPs 1639–1649
Irish MPs 1661–1666
Members of the Parliament of Ireland (pre-1801) for King's County constituencies